Niyog may refer to:
 Niyoga, a Hindu tradition
 niyog, a term for "coconut" in the Philippines

See also 
 Niog, a locality in Bacoor near Manila in the Philippines
 Niog LRT Station, a proposed station
 Niyog-niyogan, a species of vine